Gulf Playhouse, also known as Gulf Playhouse: 1st Person and First Person Playhouse, is an American anthology series that aired on Friday nights from 1952 to 1953 on NBC. Originally a standard live dramatic anthology series, it was later redeveloped as a summer replacement series whose anthology stories were now told as seen through the "eye" of the camera. The actors in each episode would talk to the camera as if it were a person, animal or object.

Gulf Playhouse debuted on October 3, 1952, replacing We the People. It initially ran on NBC opposite My Friend Irma. When it was cancelled, Gulf replaced it with The Life of Riley. The revised version, Gulf Playhouse: 1st Person, was the summer replacement for Riley in 1953.

The series ran for twenty-four episodes with stars that included Rod Steiger, Tony Randall, Kim Stanley,  Eddie Bracken, Ward Bond, Wendell Corey, and Kim Hunter.  The show's sponsor was Gulf Oil, and it was produced and directed by Frank Telford. Among its other directors were Arthur Penn. and Wes McKee. Bill Hoffman edited the scripts. Many of the writers were relatively unknown at the time. They included Carey Wilber, Frank D. Gilroy, Abby Mann, and Norman Lessing.

Episodes

References

External links

1952 American television series debuts
1953 American television series endings
1950s American anthology television series
American live television series
Black-and-white American television shows
NBC original programming